Ashur-nadin-ahhe II (Aššur-nādin-aḫḫē II) was king of Assyria from  1400 to 1391 BC. Preceded by Ashur-rim-nisheshu, he was succeeded by his brother, Eriba-Adad I.

Ashur-nadin-ahhe is an Assyrian personal name meaning “the god Ashur has given a brother” in the Akkadian language. Two Assyrian kings ruling in the 15th or early 14th century BC were called Ashur-nadin-ahhe. Hardly anything is known about these kings, but one of them is mentioned in one of the Amarna letters. In the letter from king Ashur-uballit of Assyria to the Pharaoh of Egypt, numbered EA 16, Ashur-nadin-ahhe is referred to as his ancestor who wrote to Egypt and received gold in return. This would imply an earlier diplomatic marriage and alliance between Assyria and Egypt during his reign. The name Ashur-nadin-ahhe mentioned in EA 16 has recently been contested as a faulty writing of Ashur-nadin-apli, another Assyrian king.

See also
Kings of Assyria

References

External links
Ashur-nadin-ahhe II (king of Assyria) -- Britannica Online Encyclopedia

14th-century BC Assyrian kings
15th-century BC births
1391 BC deaths

Year of birth unknown